The 2018 Première ligue de soccer du Québec season was the seventh season of play for the Première ligue de soccer du Québec, a Division 3 semi-professional soccer league in the Canadian soccer pyramid and the highest level of soccer based in the Canadian province of Québec.

AS Blainville was the defending champion and won the title again this season.

Changes from 2017 

For the first time, the league had eight teams, with CS Fabrose beginning their first season in the league.

Also this year, a new women's division was started with their debut season.

Teams 
The following eight teams took part in the 2018 season:

Standings

Top scorers

Awards

League Cup 
The cup tournament is a separate contest from the rest of the season, in which all eight teams from the league take part, and is unrelated to the season standings.  It is not a form of playoffs at the end of the season (as is typically seen in North American sports), but is a competition running in parallel to the regular season (similar to the Canadian Championship or the FA Cup), albeit only for PLSQ teams.  All matches are separate from the regular season, and are not reflected in the season standings.

In a change from previous seasons, all ties were played on a single match basis. Due to the expansion of the league to 8 teams, all clubs began in the first round.

Quarterfinals

Semifinals

Final

Reserve Division
The league operated a reserve division.

Awards

References

PLSQ
Première ligue de soccer du Québec seasons